Harold Griffin may refer to:

Harold Griffin (American football), American football player
Harold Griffin, winner of the Rhodes Scholarship
Harold Griffin, actor in The Luck of the Irish

See also
Harry Griffin (disambiguation)
Harold Griffen, American football player